Wassan Al-Khudhairi is a curator who specializes in modern and contemporary art from the Arab world. In 2017 she was appointed Chief Curator of the Contemporary Art Museum St. Louis.

As the first ever director of Mathaf: Arab Museum of Modern Art, Al-Khudhairi was responsible for developing the newly established institution, overseeing policy development, acquisitions and collections registration. During her tenure at Mathaf, she curated “Saraab: Cai Guo-Qiang” (2011) and co-curated “Sajjil: A Century of Modern Art” (2010) along with Nada Shabout and Deena Chalabi, which showcased works from Mathaf's permanent collection. Under Al-Khudhairi's leadership, Mathaf solidified its commitment to not shy away from potentially controversial work and has hosted Art Dubai's Global Art Forum for the past several years

Education 
Al-Khudhairi received her BA in Art History from Georgia State University and M.A. with distinction in Islamic Art and Architecture from the School of Oriental and African Studies (SOAS) in London. Al-Khudhairi is of Iraqi origin and has lived in Kuwait, Saudi Arabia, Egypt, the U.K. and the U.S., where she worked at the High Museum of Art in Atlanta and the Brooklyn Museum of Art in New York.

Exhibitions 
As a curator, her research interests are in modern art from the Arab world, with a particular emphasis on Iraq. Al-Khudhairi has presented on the role of Iraqi women artists in formulating modernism in Iraq. Al-Khudhairi's work often considers questions such as the use or recreation of history, memory, traumatic events such as war and civil uprising.

One of the youngest museum directors ever and a leader within the Arab world's emerging contemporary art scene, Al-Khudhairi was a Keynote speaker at the 2012 Communicating the Museum conference. She recently curated “Third Space: Shifting Conversations about Contemporary Art” at the Birmingham Museum of Art. The exhibition included works of contemporary art from the Museum's permanent collection. It was on exhibit from January 28, 2017 – January 6, 2019.

Al-Khudhairi was a Co-Artistic Director of ROUNDTABLE: The 9th Gwangju Biennale (Korea, 2012).

References

External links
Web site of Mathaf: Arab Museum of Modern Art
The Culturist
Art Asia Pacific
 The LA Times
Contemporary Art Museum St. Louis
Interview on CNN 

Living people
Iraqi emigrants to the United States
Iraqi curators
Year of birth missing (living people)
Iraqi women curators
American women curators
American curators